The Evangeline Booth House (now known as St. Andrew's Episcopal Church) is a historic house located at the hamlet of Hartsdale, Westchester County, New York.

Description and story 
It was originally built about 1870, and extensively remodeled and enlarged after acquired by Evangeline Booth (1865-1950) in 1919. It is a -story, "Y"-shaped, fieldstone and half-timbered building. It has a high gable roof with clipped gable ends covered in red "Spanish" tiles. The house is in the Tudor Revival style. It features a large stone chimney, limestone trimmed Tudor-arched entrance, and octagonal stair tower. Additions to the dwelling made by the church include a parish hall and chapel (1955). Also on the property are a contributing carriage house and stone garage. Evangeline Booth resided here until her death in 1950. She donated it to the Salvation Army, who sold it in 1951 to the St. Andrew's Episcopal Church.

It was added to the National Register of Historic Places on February 22, 2011.

See also
National Register of Historic Places listings in southern Westchester County, New York

References

External links

St. Andrew's Episcopal Church website

Houses on the National Register of Historic Places in New York (state)
Tudor Revival architecture in New York (state)
Houses in Westchester County, New York
National Register of Historic Places in Westchester County, New York